Kevin McKendree (born April 27, 1969) is an American electric blues pianist, keyboardist, guitarist, singer, and songwriter. In addition to his lengthy and varied career as a session musician, McKendree has released two solo albums.

Life and career
Born Kevin Yates McKendree, in Nuremberg, Germany, he is a self-taught pianist and guitarist, initially utilising the playing of Little Richard, Ray Charles and B.B. King as inspiration. At the age of 17, he became a professional musician and worked around the Washington, D.C. area playing alongside Big Joe Maher, Tom Principato, Bob Margolin and Mark Wenner. However, he also worked as a piano salesman to supplement his income. He relocated to Nashville, Tennessee in 1995, and secured a job backing Lee Roy Parnell as part of his band known as the Hot Links.  McKendree co-wrote and co-produced the instrumental track "Mama, Screw Your Wig On Tight," which appeared on Parnell's 1997 album, Every Night's a Saturday Night.  The piece was nominated for a Grammy Award in 1997 for Best Country Instrumental.

In 1997, McKendree toured with Delbert McClinton as his band leader, and played piano and Hammond B3 organ on McClinton's albums Nothing Personal (2001) and Cost of Living (2005), both of which won a Grammy, and Room to Breathe (2002) which was nominated for a similar award. In addition, McKendree worked in the recording studio backing a diverse array of musicians including Anson Funderburgh and Seven Mary Three (The Economy of Sound, Orange Ave.), as well as issuing his debut solo album Miss Laura's Kitchen in 2000.  His association with McClinton ceased in 2011 which allowed McKendree more flexibility, and he worked with Brian Setzer, John Oates, T. Graham Brown, Tinsley Ellis, The Knockouts, Hal Ketchum, and George Thorogood (2120 South Michigan Ave.) amongst many others. His work with Tinsley Ellis saw McKendree play on the Ellis albums, Fire It Up, Kingpin, Hell or High Water, Moment of Truth, Speak No Evil, and The Hard Way.

In 2005, McKendree issued his second album, Hammers & Strings. AllMusic noted that it was "a set full of boogie-woogie piano (even on non-blues tunes), blues ballads, and New Orleans-style R&B, this is a delightful outing." In the same year McKendree played on Brian Setzer's album, Rockabilly Riot Vol. 1: A Tribute To Sun Records. In 2008, McKendree contributed to Randy Houser's debut album, Anything Goes, playing Wurlitzer electric piano and Hammond organ.

More recently, McKendree has focused on songwriting and production work in his own recording studio, The Rock House, which is based in Franklin, Tennessee. In 2013, McKendree engineered Sean Chambers' album, The Rock House Sessions, which was recorded in his own studio.

He continues to perform regularly, most recently playing in the Mike Henderson Band at the Bluebird Cafe in Nashville.

Discography

See also
List of electric blues musicians

References

External links
Official website

1969 births
Living people
American blues singers
American blues pianists
American male pianists
American blues guitarists
American male guitarists
American rhythm and blues keyboardists
American session musicians
Electric blues musicians
Singers from Washington, D.C.
Guitarists from Washington, D.C.
20th-century American guitarists
20th-century American pianists
21st-century American keyboardists
21st-century American pianists
20th-century American male musicians
21st-century American male musicians